Vasyl Dmyrovych Rachyba (born January 27, 1982, in Dolyna Raion, Ivano-Frankivsk Oblast) is an amateur Ukrainian Greco-Roman wrestler, who played for the men's light heavyweight category. He defeated Russia's Alan Khugayev for the gold medal in his respective division at the 2011 European Wrestling Championships in Dortmund, Germany. Rachyba is also a member of the wrestling team for CSKA Kyiv, and is coached and trained by Yury Tsikolenko.

Rachyba represented Ukraine at the 2012 Summer Olympics in London, where he competed for the men's 84 kg class. He defeated Tunisian wrestler and two-time Olympian Haykel Achouri in the preliminary round of sixteen, before losing out the quarterfinal match to Georgia's Vladimer Gegeshidze, with a three-set technical score (1–2, 3–0, 0–1), and a classification point score of 1–3.

References

External links
NBC Olympics Profile
 

1982 births
Living people
Olympic wrestlers of Ukraine
Wrestlers at the 2012 Summer Olympics
Ukrainian male sport wrestlers
Sportspeople from Ivano-Frankivsk Oblast